Brian Mackenzie, Baron Mackenzie of Framwellgate,  (born 21 March 1943) is a former British Labour and now non-aligned member of the House of Lords. He is the former President of the Police Superintendents' Association.

Early life
Mackenzie was born in Darlington and educated at Eastbourne Boys School. After joining the police studied law at the University of London.

Career
Mackenzie rose through the ranks of the police service, becoming a Superintendent upon secondment to the Home Office and later becoming Chief Superintendent in the Durham Constabulary. A graduate of the FBI Academy at Quantico, Virginia, he was active in the Police Superintendents' Association and was its President for three years.

Politics
In 1998, Mackenzie was raised to the Peerage as Baron Mackenzie of Framwellgate, of Durham in the County of Durham. In the House of Lords, Mackenzie has been most active in speaking on issues relating to crime and policing issues. He published his memoir, "Two Lives of Brian – from Policing to Politics" in 2004. [Published by The Memoir Club]

Honours and awards

Mackenzie held the historical and honorary appointment of Billet Master of the City of Durham between 1989 and 2003. He was made an Honorary Member of the Rotary Club of Chester-le-Street in 2001.
He was appointed OBE in the 1998 New Year Honours for services to the Police Service and the Police Superintendents' Association of England and Wales.

References

External links
Lord Mackenzie of Framwellgate's web site.
Durham City Labour Party on Lord Mackenzie of Framwellgate's political activities.
Chester-le-Street Rotary Club biography of Lord Mackenzie of Framwellgate
Announcement of his introduction at the House of Lords House of Lords minutes of proceedings, 20 July 1998
Two Lives of Brian From Policing to Politics- also available on Amazon Kindle The Memoir Club

1943 births
Living people
People from Darlington
Alumni of the University of London
British police officers
Officers of the Order of the British Empire
Mackenzie of Framwellgate
Life peers created by Elizabeth II